Fun Fun Fun Fest (often abbreviated as "FFF" or "F3F") was an annual music and comedy festival held in Austin, Texas, United States. The festival was the only genre based festival in the United States, featuring stages that focused specifically on hip-hop / electronica, indie rock, punk / metal, and comedy.

Started in 2006, the festival focused on a combination of discovering emerging talent and putting together rarely seen or anticipated reunion performances. Being based in Austin (The Live Music Capital of the World), FFF had the unique opportunity to work with newer performers that had yet to experience the national stage. The festival had a history of unearthing new artists that eventually ended up in mainstream music and festival markets. The festival's name itself was a nod to the independent music scene in Austin, specifically Big Boys, an early and highly influential hardcore punk band who released their EP "Fun Fun Fun" through the Austin-based underground label Moment Productions in 1982. After the final Fun Fun Fun Fest, some of the organizers went on to produce Sound on Sound Fest, "Sound on Sound" also a title of a Big Boys song.

Fun Fun Fun Fest was dedicated to Austin's unique culture, featuring street food from some of Austin's favorite eateries, an annual American Poster Institute poster show featuring work from artists across the country, pop-up vintage fashion shops, hair salons, and record stores. The festival also hosted everything from a mechanical bull to a live wrestling ring featuring Sexy Sax Man on site.

Notable performers include Public Enemy, Spoon, Weird Al Yankovic, Girl Talk, The Descendents, MGMT, Bad Religion, Danzig, Mastodon, The Dead Milkmen,  Slayer, Slick Rick, Pharcyde, Cat Power, The National, M83, Circle Jerks, Todd Barry, Reggie Watts, Henry Rollins, Neil Hamburger, GWAR, the return of famed Detroit punkers, Death, and many more.

In 2011, Fun Fun Fun Fest was moved to Auditorium Shores, a much larger downtown park, a change from previous years in which the event was held at Waterloo Park. 2011 saw the addition of a third full day and FFF Nites, a set of free aftershows for ticket holders in downtown Austin music venues, featuring an additional 75+ artists. Additionally, Ryan Gosling and Rooney Mara filmed a sequence for the Terrence Malick film Song to Song on November 4, 2011, on the festival grounds.

The 2012 festival took place November 2–4 at Auditorium Shores. The event made headlines with the announcement of a reunion of the hip hop group, Run–D.M.C. for their first show in a decade.

The festival had its final year in 2015. Some of the event producers have moved on to produce an event called Sound on Sound Music Festival, which takes place at the Sherwood Forest Faire site in McDade, TX

Lineups

2015

Orange Stage

 Jane's Addiction
 D'Angelo and the Vanguard (Cancelled)
 Chromeo
 CHVRCHES
 Cheap Trick
 RIDE
 Antemasque
 Toro y Moi
 American Football
 The Growlers
 Fuzz
 Mikal Cronin
 The Charlatans
 Preoccupations (Viet Cong)
 Alvvays
 Speedy Ortiz
 Broncho
 Joanna Gruesome
 Grifters
 Creepoid
 A Giant Dog
 Golden Dawn Arkestra
 Think No Think
 Ringo Deathstarr
 Lauryn Hill

Blue Stage

 Wu-Tang Clan
 Future Islands
 ScHoolboy Q
 Grimes
 ODESZA
 Neon Indian
 Rae Sremmurd
 MSTRKRFT
 Hudson Mohawke
 Gesaffelstein
 Peaches
 Joey Bada$$
 Big Freedia
 Afrika Bambaataa (DJ set)
 Slow Magic
 Lido
 Doomtree
 Anamanaguchi
 Roosevelt
 Shamir
 Bomba Estereo
 Kembe X
 Two-9
 Bayonne (Roger Sellers)
 The Outfit, TX
 S U R V I V E
 Keeper

Black Stage

 Venom
 NOFX
 Gogol Bordello
 Coheed and Cambria
 Drive Like Jehu
 L7
 Dag Nasty
 Desaparecidos (Canceled)
 American Nightmare
 Archers of Loaf
 Converge
 Chain Of Strength
 Babes In Toyland
 Parquet Courts
 Off!
 La Dispute
 Title Fight
 Fucked Up
 Head Wound City
 The Dwarves
 Mutoid Man
 Nothing
 together PANGEA
 Power Trip
 American Sharks
 Future Death

Yellow Stage

 Tig Notaro
 Andrew W.K.
 Doug Benson
 GZA
 Gad Elmaleh
 Kurt Braunohler
 Lucas Bros
 Eric Andre
 Sabrina Jalees
 Todd Barry
 Eugene Mirman
 Derrick C. Brown
 Murder By Death
 Twerking Lessons with Big Freedia
 Cass McCombs
 Lil Freckles
 Steve Gunn
 BadBadNotGood
 Chris Cubas
 Dr. Scott Bolton
 Saffron Herndon
 King Khan & BBQ Show
 Bad Example
 Benjamin Booker
 East Cameron Folkcore
 Andrew Jackson Jihad
 Sandbox with Rob Gagnon
 TOPS
 Air Sex World Championships
 The Altercation Punk Comedy Tour
 The Secret Group
 ATX Comedy Hour
 Greetings From Queer Mountain
 Master Pancake
 The New Movement

Ride & Skate

 Ryan Sheckler
 Grant Taylor
 Chase Hawk
 Rune Glifberg
 Aaron Ross
 David González
 Dustin Dollin
 Louie Lopez
 Tom Dugan
 Collin Provost
 Clint Reynolds
 Axel Cruysberghs
 Joseph Frans
 Ben Raemers
 Dani Lightningbolt
 Chris Pfanner
 Nina Buitrago
 Caswell Berry
 Matt Nordstrom
 Paul Cvikevich
 Kenny Horton
 Jeremie Infelise
 Devin Fredlund
 CJ Collins

Wrestling 
* Anarchy Championship Wrestling
 Inspire Pro Wrestling

FFF Nites

 Tig Notaro
 Andrew W.K.
 Future Islands
 Doug Benson
 GZA
 Lagwagon
 Kurt Braunohler
 American Football
 Hudson Mohawke
 Lucas Bros
 The Growlers
 American Nightmare
 Eric Andre
 Fuzz
 Mayhem
 Converge
 Watain
 Mikal Cronin
 Sabrina Jalees
 Peaches
 Chain Of Strength
 Joey Bada$$
 Subhumans
 Todd Barry
 Skinny Puppy
 Viet Cong
 Les Sins (Toro Y Moi DJ Set)
 Parquet Courts
 Alvvays
 OFF!
 Speedy Ortiz
 La Dispute
 Slow Magic
 Title Fight
 Murder By Death
 Doomtree
 Trippy Turtle
 Fucked Up
 Lil Freckles
 Steve Gunn
 Broncho
 Har Mar Superstar
 Head Wound City
 Anamanaguchi
 Joanna Gruesome
 Roosevelt
 The Dwarves
 Grifters
 Windhand
 Shamir
 King Khan & BBQ Show
 Creepoid
 East Cameron Folkcore
 Mutoid Man
 Snakehips
 Small Brown Bike
 TOPS
 Giraffage
 Nothing
 Runaway Kids
 Sarah Jaffe
 together PANGEA
 A Giant Dog
 Power Trip
 Two-9
 Bayonne (Roger Sellers)
 Girlpool
 Golden Dawn Arkestra
 Think No Think
 Alex G
 Pity Sex
 Ringo Deathstarr
 Wild Ones
 The Outfit, TX
 American Sharks
 Danava
 S U R V I V E
 Dirty Fences
 Future Death
 One Night Stand
 Live Action Battle Rap
 Keeper
 Pure Bathing Culture
 Rotting Christ
 Empty Vessels
 The Applicators
 Youth Code
 GEMS
 Milezo
 Protextor
 Crooked Bangs
 NOTS
 Sniper 66
 Dirty Kid Discount
 Borzoi
 Xetas
 Daktyl
 Vockah Redu
 Cult Leader
 Magna Carda
 Christeene
 Moving Panoramas
 soundfounder
 Technicolor Hearts
 Yonatan Gat
 Magnet School
 OBN III's
 PEARS
 The Bad Lovers
 Monolord
 Wildhoney
 Otis The Destroyer
 The Well
 Wet Lungs
 Big Bill
 Moonlight Towers
 Slooom
 Booher
 Illustrations
 Body Pressure
 Late Night Basement
 Commoners
 Red Death
 Sailor Poon
 Carl Sagan's Skate Shoes
 Rozwell Kid
 Easy Prey
 Barnaby Saints
 Tele Novella
 Woodgrain
 Feral Future
 Hard Proof
 Hidden Ritual
 Kid Trails
 Dead Tapes
 Fuck Work
 Burnt Skull
 Corduroi & Selva Oscura

2014

Music

 Judas Priest
 Nas
 Girl Talk
 Neutral Milk Hotel
 Modest Mouse
 King Diamond
 Wiz Khalifa
 alt-J
 Death From Above 1979
 2 Chainz
 Rocket From The Crypt
 Dinosaur Jr.
 Atmosphere
 First Aid Kit
 The Blood Brothers
 The New Pornographers
 Flying Lotus
 Gorilla Biscuits
 Guided By Voices
 Sky Ferreira
 City and Colour
 Amon Amarth
 Gary Numan
 Failure
 Glassjaw
 Yo La Tengo
 The Presets
 Black Lips
 Dum Dum Girls
 Ginuwine
 Iceage
 Z Trip
 Hot Water Music
 Foxygen
 Run the Jewels
 Sick of It All
 Courtney Barnett
 Cashmere Cat
 Mineral
 Deafheaven
 Freddie Gibbs & Madlib
 METZ
 San Fermin
 Sun Kil Moon
 Lunice
 Pissed Jeans
 Yann Tiersen
 SZA
 Majical Cloudz
 Jello Biafra and the Guantanamo School of Medicine
 Yelle
 Pallbearer
 Angel Olsen
 Iron Reagan
 The Internet
 Knapsack
 Pianos Become the Teeth
 SOHN
 Ryan Hemsworth
 Tinariwen
 J Mascis
 Mas Ysa
 The Bots
 King Tuff
 Say Lou Lou
 Fat White Family
 Chelsea Wolfe
 Gardens & Villa
 Reputante
 Roosevelt
 Radkey
 ASTR
 Spider Bags
 Cities Aviv
 Twin Peaks
 Julianna Barwick
 Wildcat Wildcat
 Jacuzzi
 Scott H. Biram
 The World is a Beautiful Place & I am No Longer Afraid to Die
 Nostalghia
 Thundercat
 This Will Destroy You
 Zorch
 Crooked Bangs
 Blue, The Misfit.
 Dana Falconberry
 Communion
 The Sour Notes
 Breakout
 The Digital Wild
 Good Field
 Intimate Stranger
 Residual Kid

Wrestling 
* Anarchy Championship Wrestling
 Inspire Pro Wrestling

2013

Music

 MGMT
 M.I.A.
 Slayer
 Chelsea Light Moving
 Misfits
 Snoop Dogg
 Descendents
 Cut Copy
 Jurassic 5
 Flag
 Simian Mobile Disco
 Quicksand
 The Walkmen
 Ice-T
 Bonobo
 Lupe Fiasco
 Killer Mike
 Television
 RJD2
 The Locust
 The Julie Ruin
 The Impossibles
 Judge
 Big K.R.I.T.
 Subhumans
 Big Freedia
 Chromatics
 Gojira
 Tycho
 Geographer
 Glass Candy
 Body Count
 Deerhunter
 August Burns Red
 Thee Oh Sees
 Cloud Nothings
 Action Bronson
 The Dismemberment Plan
 Cro-Mags
 Shlohmo
 Ceremony
 Washed Out
 XXYYXX
 Johnny Marr
 Melt Banana
 Retox
 Little Boots
 Kurt Vile
 Pelican
 Delorean
 Sparks
 Star Slinger
 Polyphonic Spree
 Title Fight
 Poolside
 Blake Schwarzenbach
 White Lung
 Dessa
 Small Black
 King Khan and the Shrines
 Bill Callahan
 LNS Crew

Wrestling

2012

Music

 Run–D.M.C.
 X
 Edward Sharpe and the Magnetic Zeroes
 De La Soul
 Santigold
 The Head and the Heart
 Bun B
 Fucked Up
 Girl Talk
 Explosions in the Sky
 Real Estate
 The Promise Ring
 Turbonegro
 Superchunk
 Rakim
 Titus Andronicus
 Against Me!
 Cursive
 Kreayshawn
 Schoolboy Q
 Refused
 Danny Brown
 Liturgy
 ASAP Rocky
 Japandroids
 Lagwagon
 Surfer Blood
 Public Image Ltd

Comedy

David Cross
Hannibal Buress
Wyatt Cenac
Doug Benson
Eugene Mirman
Saul Williams
Jon Benjamin
Duncan Carson
Ramin Nazer
Doug Mellard
Chris Cubas

Wrestling

2011

Music

 Public Enemy
 Slayer
 Passion Pit
 Spoon
 Danzig Legacy
 Lykke Li
 Flying Lotus
 Hum
 Childish Gambino
 Black Lips
 Girls
 Clap Your Hands Say Yeah
 Reggie Watts
 Diplo
 Architecture in Helsinki
 Okkervil River
 Neon Indian
 Ra Ra Riot
 Murder City Devils
 Donald Glover
 Tune-Yards
 M83
 The Joy Formidable
 We Were Promised Jetpacks
 Turquoise Jeep
 Joe Lally
 Major Lazer
 Odd Future
 Death Grips
 Ted Leo and the Pharmacists
 Del tha Funkee Homosapien
 Black Joe Lewis
 The Thermals
 Cloud Nothings
 Jim Ward
 Future Islands
 Keep Shelly in Athens
 Budos Band
 Mates of State
 Russian Circles
 Thee Oh Sees
 Ty Segall
 The Damned
 Hot Snakes
 Blonde Redhead
 Boris
 Cannibal Corpse
 Four Tet
 Spank Rock
 Big Freedia
 YACHT
 Rakim
 Cold Cave
 Cave In
 Dan Deacon
 Baths
 Grimes

Comedy

Henry Rollins
Reggie Watts
Brian Posehn
Upright Citizens Brigade
Donald Glover
Neal Brennan

Wrestling

2010

 Descendents
 Weird Al Yankovic
 MGMT
 Bad Religion
 RJD2
 Mastodon
 Deerhunter
 Yelle
 The Hold Steady
 Dirty Projectors
 Os Mutantes
 Monotonix
 Gwar
 The Vandals
 Suicidal Tendencies
 The Appleseed Cast
 Best Coast
 Wavves
 Kaki King
 Margot & the Nuclear So and So's
 Slick Rick
 Man Man
 Devin the Dude
 Cap'n Jazz
 Ariel Pink
 Polvo
 Dum Dum Girls
 Crocodiles
 Toro y Moi
 Indian Jewelry
 Mother Falcon
 A-Trak
 Big Freedia
 Junius
 Kylesa
 Valient Thorr
 Snapcase
 Eagle Claw

Wrestling

Comedy 
 Moshe Kasher

2009

 Death
 Crystal Castles
 Ratatat
 Yeasayer
 The Cool Kids
 Danzig
 Kid Sister
 This Will Destroy You
 Broadcast
 GZA/Genius
 Why?
 Destroyer
 No Age
 Gorilla Biscuits
 The Strange Boys
 Atlas Sound
 Neon Indian
 Fuck Buttons
 The Jesus Lizard
 Brian Posehn
 Les Savy Fav
 Lucero
 Mika Miko
 7 Seconds
 Mission of Burma

2008

 The National
 Clap Your Hands Say Yeah
 Minus The Bear
 ...And You Will Know Us by the Trail of Dead
 Atmosphere
 Clipse
 Deerhoof
 Islands
 Frightened Rabbit
 The Bouncing Souls
 Bad Brains
 Bishop Allen
 The Spinto Band
 Dr. Octagon
 Dan Deacon
 YACHT
 The Black Angels
 Annuals
 The Octopus Project
 Leftöver Crack
 Adolescents
 Municipal Waste
 The Dead Milkmen
 Swingin' Utters
 Tim and Eric

2007

 MGMT
 Cat Power
 Of Montreal
 Explosions In The Sky
 The Cribs
 The New Pornographers
 Okkervil River
 Mates of State
 Girl Talk
 GRAND BUFFET
 DJ Jester the Filipino Fist
 Final Fantasy
 Battles-Diplo
 Sick of It All
 Neurosis
 Headlights
 I Love You But I've Chosen Darkness
 Don Caballero
 HorrorPops
 Madball
 The Sword
 Lifetime
 White Denim
 The Saints
 Angry Samoans
 Against Me!
 Youth Brigade
 Evangelicals

2006

 Spoon
 Circle Jerks
 Prefuse 73
 Peaches
 Lucero
 Negative Approach
 Riverboat Gamblers
 The Black Angels
 Dead Meadow
 The Octopus Project
 Electric Frankenstein
 Lower Class Brats
 Applicators
 Krumbums
 Iron Age
 ADHD
 DJ Mel
 Quintron and Miss Pussycat
 Learning Secrets
 Dirty South Ravers
 The Oranges Band
 Drag the River
 Whitey
Learning Secrets
 Ceeplus Bad Knives
 Thomas Turner of Ghostland Observatory

Fun Fun Fun Fest Taco Cannon
Premiering at the 2012 Fun Fun Fun Fest in Austin, TX, the Fun Fun Fun Fest Taco Cannon was a modified 12-chamber T-shirt cannon specifically designed to shoot tacos a maximum 200 feet in the air. The Fun Fun Fun Fest Taco Cannon was the first and only taco launching device. The cannon was powered by carbon dioxide and a car battery, and "takes 40 pounds of carbon dioxide to get through three round of Gatling gun-style shots" with "12 barrels in each round, so 36 shots total per round."

See also
 Music of Austin

References

External links
 

Festivals in Austin, Texas
Music of Austin, Texas
Hip hop music festivals in the United States
Rock festivals in the United States
Punk rock festivals
Indie rock festivals
Comedy festivals in the United States